Dick Stevens (born February 23, 1948) is a former American football offensive tackle who played five seasons in the National Football League (NFL).

Early life and high school
Stevens "Tuck" was born and raised in Dublin, Texas, where he attended Dublin High School. He was named All-District at both end and defensive tackle for three consecutive seasons and was named All-State and an All-American as a senior. Stevens was recruited by every school in the Southwest Conference and opted to play at Baylor where his uncle, Gordon Hollon, had played.

College career
Stevens played defensive tackle on Baylor's freshman team before moving to offensive tackle. In his three years as a letterman, the Bears won four total games. Stevens was a unanimous All-SWC selection as a junior and was named a preseason All-American going into his senior year. He missed part of his senior season sue to a knee injury. Stevens was inducted into the Baylor Athletic Hall of Fame in 2014.

Professional career
Stevens was selected in the 13th round of the 1970 NFL Draft by the Philadelphia Eagles. He was a member of the team for five seasons before retiring due to knee injuries.

References

1948 births
Living people
American football offensive tackles
Baylor Bears football players
Philadelphia Eagles players
Players of American football from Texas